Vadim Martinchik (born 1934) is a retired Soviet  swimmer who won a bronze medal in the 200 m butterfly at the 1954 European Aquatics Championships. During his career he set five national records in this event. After retirement he worked as a sport official in Lviv Oblast.

References

1934 births
Living people
Ukrainian male swimmers
Male butterfly swimmers
Soviet male swimmers
European Aquatics Championships medalists in swimming
Sportspeople from Lviv